WCHS may refer to:

Broadcasting
 WCHS (AM), a radio station (580 AM) licensed to Charleston, West Virginia, United States
 WCHS-TV, a television station (channel 29, virtual 8) licensed to Charleston, West Virginia
 WCHS-LP, a low-power radio station (102.7 FM) licensed to serve Sylvester, Georgia, United States

Education
Multiple schools:
 Western Christian High School (disambiguation), is the name of multiple schools
 Winston Churchill High School (disambiguation) is the name of multiple schools

Canada:
 Western Canada High School in Calgary, Alberta
 Wetaskiwin Composite High School in Wetaskiwin, Alberta

United Kingdom:
 West Calder High School near Livingston, West Lothian, Scotland
 The Westgate School for Girls in Winchester, England
 Woodford County High School in Woodford Green, London

United States:
 Washington Catholic High School in Washington, Indiana
 Water Canyon High School in Hildale, Utah
 Watson Chapel High School in Pine Bluff, Arkansas
 Webster County High School in Dixon, Kentucky
 Webster County High School in Upperglade, West Virginia
 Wesley Chapel High School in Wesley Chapel, Florida
 West Carroll High School in Savanna, Illinois
 West Carrollton High School in West Carrollton, Ohio
 West Clermont High School in Union Township, Clermont County, Ohio
 West Covina High School in West Covina, California
 Whiteland Community High School in Whiteland, Indiana
 Whittier Christian High School in La Habra, California
 Woodford County High School in Versailles, Kentucky
 Worthington Christian High School (Worthington, Ohio) in Worthington, Franklin County, Ohio